Tatler is a British magazine, founded in 1901, published by Condé Nast Publications, focusing on society, fashion, politics and lifestyle.

Tatler may also refer to:

 Ulster Tatler, a Northern Irish lifestyle magazine founded in 1966
 Tatler (1709 journal), a British literary and society journal founded by Richard Steele in 1709
The Tatler: A Daily Journal of Literature and the Stage edited by Leigh Hunt from 1830 to 1832
 Brian Tatler, guitarist of the heavy metal band Diamond Head
 Southern Suburbs Tatler, South African newspaper
 "The Tatler", a song from the 1999 Billy Bragg album Reaching to the Converted

See also
 Tattler (disambiguation)
 Tattletale (disambiguation)
 Tatle (disambiguation)